Buckra or Backra is a term of West African origin. It is mainly used in the Caribbean and in the Southeast United States. Originally, it was used by slaves to address their white slave master. Later the meaning was broadened to describe white people in general.

Etymology 
"Buckra" has been found in many variants, successively bacceroe, bochara, backra, baccra, bakra, buckera, buckra, bockra, and more. It probably derives from the Ibibio and Efik Annang word mbakara, meaning (white) European or master. The word traces back to the 16th and 17th century slavery, when slaves were transported from Sub-Saharan African to plantations into the Caribbean by European colonizers.

Originally, it was used by slaves to address their white slave master and their overseers. Later the meaning was broadened to describe white people in general. After the abolition of slavery, the word survived to refer to white people, usually used by black people in the US in derogatory meaning.

In the Caribbean 
From about the 16th century, enslaved West Africans, notably Igbo and Ibibio, were shipped to Jamaica to work on plantations. A book written by Allen Eric about Jamaica, published in 1896, is titled "Buckra" Land — Two weeks in Jamaica. It mentions the word buckra, "meaning man", used by Jamaican black people to greet strangers. In Jamaican Patois, both 
Bakra and Backra are translated as (white) slave master. In Jamaica, the written form and educated pronunciation is as buckra; in folk pronunciation rather as backra similar to the source word mbakara.

In Sranan Tongo, a creole language in the former Dutch colony Suriname, the usual spelling is Bakra, originally referring to the white slave owner on a plantation, or a white master in general. Nowadays, it primarily refers to a Dutch white person, but may also mean a white person in general.

Also in Guyana, the original meaning was white plantation owner, later a white person, or even an important non-white.

Poor buckras 
Barbados has a history of colonization and slavery too. From the 1630s, when Barbados had become an English colony, large numbers of poor indentured Irish people were brought to Barbados to work on sugar plantations. Other whites, such as military prisoners, widows and orphans, brought to plantation-owners to work in the fields were shipped to the Caribbean, effectively as poorly paid and treated servants, not to be mistaken for slaves. They were meant to supplement the African slaves. In Barbados, these endogamous poor, white-skinned people were also called "poor backras" or "buckras".

Use in the United States 
In the second half of the 17th century, tens of thousands of indentured settlers of Barbados migrated to the other colonies when they did not secure the little piece of land they were supposed to get after expiration of their contract. Many moved on to the North American mainland. South Carolina in particular was founded by settlers from Barbados who brought many enslaved Africans with them. These slaves spoke an English-based Creole language that later became known as Gullah. This Creole was allowed to develop due to the fact that enslaved Africans in coastal South Carolina had limited contact with Whites or Blacks from other areas of the South. This Creole is still spoken today by descendants of the Gullah people in the South Carolina and Georgia low-country region.

Today, "buckra" is still used in the Southeast United States by the Gullah people, referring to white people. It refers especially to the poor, although the buckras were, in the eyes of the black slaves, the rich class in former times:

"De nigger was de right arm of de buckra class. The buckra was de horn of plenty for de nigger. Both suffer in consequence of freedom."...(Moses Lyles, a former slave in South Carolina, speaking in the 1930s). As clearly noted in this 1916 publication, there was also the white trash level of buckra, referred to by both Southern races as "poor buckras"...locally pronounced "po' buckras".

See also

List of English words of African origin

References

African-American slang
Gullah culture
Ibibio
Pejorative terms for white people